Tékane  is a town and urban commune in the Trarza Region of southern Mauritania, near the border of Senegal. It lies east of Rosso.

In 2000 it had a population of 22,041.

References

Communes of Trarza Region